Jizan Regional Airport , is an airport serving Jizan (also spelled Gizan), the capital city of the Jizan Province in Saudi Arabia. It is also known as King Abdullah bin Abdulaziz Airport, named after King Abdullah Bin Abdulaziz.

Facilities
The airport has one main terminal with two different sectors; one for departures and one for arrivals respectively.
The airport also has another small terminal for short haul international arrivals and departures to near countries such as Emirates and Egypt

Airlines and destinations

Airlines offering scheduled passenger service:

Replacement
The Civil Aviation of Saudi Arabia has confirmed and released a short trailer of the new airport that will replace the current airport. It will be named King Abdullah International Airport Jizan. According to the Centre Of Aviation's official website, the airport project, estimated at SR 2.5 billion (US$667 million), will feature a single passenger terminal with 10 aircraft gates and a VIP lounge, cargo facilities and a control tower. The airport is predicted to have the capacity to handle 2.4 million passengers p/a.

International Flights
The General Authority for Civil Aviation (GACA) started operations of international flights to and from King Abdullah Bin Abdulaziz Airport in Jazan on April 9, 2015,

The airport received the first international flight from Cairo International Airport with over 100 passengers on board.

Director General of the airport Hamid Hammad Al-Ghareebi and other officials received the first international flight.

History

Some Yemeni rebels attempted to attack the airport and other airports in the region. It failed.

Statistics

See also

 List of things named after Saudi Kings
 General Authority of Civil Aviation
 King Fahd International Airport

References

 http://centreforaviation.com/profiles/newairports/jazan-king-abdullah-bin-abdulaziz-airport

External links
 
 
 

Airports in Saudi Arabia
Jizan Province